Parti Parikatha (Story of the Barren soil), is a Hindi novel written by Phanishwar Nath Renu. The story revolves around a motley group of characters in a remote village of North Eastern Bihar in the backdrop of Zamindari (landlordism) Abolition movement.

See also

 Maila Anchal, also by Phanishwar Nath Renu.

References

Hindi-language novels
20th-century Indian novels
Culture of Mithila
Books on Mithila Region